Sovereign's Bodyguard is the name given to three ceremonial units in the United Kingdom who are tasked with guarding the Sovereign. These units are:

His Majesty's Body Guard of the Honourable Corps of Gentlemen at Armsformed 1509
King's Body Guard of the Yeomen of the Guardformed 1485
Royal Company of Archers, the King's Body Guard for Scotlandformed 1676; entered royal service 1822

Although the Yeomen of the Guard is older, the Gentlemen at Arms are more senior, due to their being classed as 'gentlemen' rather than 'yeomen', and because they are classed as the 'nearest guard', i.e. the personal guard to the Sovereign. The Royal Company of Archers performs this role when the Sovereign is in Scotland.

External links
The Queen's review of all of her bodyguards
The King's Body Guard of the Yeomen of the Guard
The Honourable Corps of Gentlemen at Arms
The Royal Company of Archers

British ceremonial units
Bodyguards
Positions within the British Royal Household